Gordonia jinhuaensis is a Gram-positive, aerobic, rod-shaped and non-motile bacterium from the genus Gordonia which has been isolated from pharmaceutical wastewater from Jinhua in China.

References

External links
Type strain of Gordonia jinhuaensis at BacDive -  the Bacterial Diversity Metadatabase	
 

Mycobacteriales
Bacteria described in 2014